Boulderwood is a historic private summer camp on the shore of Squam Lake in Holderness, New Hampshire.  Located on Mooney Point, the camp was developed beginning in the 1920s by Elwyn G. Preston.  Preston, whose family had summered in other camps located on the point, began purchasing land in 1922, which included  of shoreline, which was gradually expanded with other land purchases.

The camp was listed on the National Register of Historic Places in 2018.

See also

National Register of Historic Places listings in Grafton County, New Hampshire

References

Houses on the National Register of Historic Places in New Hampshire
Houses in Grafton County, New Hampshire
National Register of Historic Places in Grafton County, New Hampshire
Holderness, New Hampshire
Squam Lake